Monalizumab (formerly IPH2201) is an investigational drug being studied for rheumatoid arthritis, gynecologic malignancies and other cancers.

Mechanism of action
Monalizumab is a monoclonal antibody targeted at NKG2A. It is a checkpoint inhibitor.

References

Experimental drugs
Monoclonal antibodies
AstraZeneca brands